Abid Hussain Ansari is an Indian politician, businessman and a proponent of the Grand Ashura Procession In Kashmir. He was a sitting member of Jammu and Kashmir's Legislative Assembly for the Jammu and Kashmir People's Democratic Party.

Political career 
After death of his Brother Iftikhar Hussain Ansari in 2014, Abid Hussain Ansari was fielded by Jammu and Kashmir Peoples Democratic Party at the constituency Zadibal. In the 2014 Jammu and Kashmir Legislative Assembly election Abid Hussain Ansari won from his constituency with more than 4000+ votes.

See also
 Molvi Iftikhar Hussain Ansari
 Imran Raza Ansari

References

 
 

Shia clerics
Politicians from Srinagar
1946 births
Living people
Jammu and Kashmir MLAs 2014–2018